Theodore Nemzek (February 11, 1906 – May 21, 1968) was an American football player. He played college football for Moorhead State and in the National Football League (NFL) as a tackle for the Minneapolis Red Jackets (1930). He appeared in four NFL games, three as a starter.

References

1906 births
1968 deaths
Minneapolis Red Jackets players
Players of American football from Minnesota
American football tackles
People from Moorhead, Minnesota
Minnesota State–Moorhead Dragons football players